Dapansutrile (OLT1177) is an inhibitor of the NLRP3 (nucleotide-binding domain leucine-rich repeat and pyrin domain containing receptor 3) inflammasome.

An inflammasome can be defined as an immune system receptor that induces inflammation through the activation of caspase 1 and caspase 11 when it is triggered by damaged cells, microbial pathogens, and stress. NLRP3 is a canonical inflammasome. The NLRP3 inflammasome comprises NLRP3, the apoptosis spec-like protein (ASC) and the caspase-1 (Figure 1). The NLRP3 inflammasome forms by binding to pattern recognition receptors (PRRs) and damage associated molecular patterns (DAMPS) that activate caspase 1 which then signals for the secretion of pro-inflammatory cytokines IL-1β and IL-18 resulting in pyroptosis Constant activation of the NLRP3 inflammasome is believed to play a direct or indirect role in acute arthritis, atherosclerosis and various neurodegenerative diseases such as multiple sclerosis (MS), Alzheimer's disease (AD), and Parkinson's disease (PD),,. This drug was developed by Olactec Therapeutics with the purpose of decreasing IL-1β peripheral inflammation by binding to the NLRP3 protein and inhibiting the formation of the NLRP3 inflammasome. Interestingly, dapansutrile has also been found to reduce levels of pro inflammatory cytokines IL-18 without interfering with TNF-α levels. Stressed cells in the system can ignite the NLRP3 inflammasome which in turn produces the secretion inflammatory cytokines such as IL-1β and IL-18. Dapansutrile has tested in clinical trials and has been proposed as a beneficial compound for the remedy of osteoarthritis, and gouty arthritis. Nevertheless, other preclinical research has proposed dapansutrile to be potentially beneficial for heart failure and multiple sclerosis.

Molecular Structure and Properties 
Dapansutrile is a β-sulfonyl nitrile compound with four carbon, seven hydrogen, one nitrogen, two oxygen, and one sulfur atom (Figure 2). The molecular formula of this compound is C4H7NO2S, and it carries a molecular weight of 133.7 g/mol. Compound acknowledged by the names of dapansutrile, OLT1177, and 3-(methylsulfonyl)propanenitrile.

Synthesis 
OLT1177 is synthesized by alkylation of sodium methanesulfinate with 3-bromopropionitrile. This reaction produces crude methylsulfonylpropionitrile which is then purified through dissolution into acetone, filtration of the sodium bromide bi-product, solvent exchange via distillation, and recrystallization from ethanol.

Dapansutrile's Mechanism of Action

Dapansutrile's Reaction Pathways 
Dapansutrile denoted as a β-sulfonyl nitrile molecule. Its mechanism of action induces a Pinner reaction which is initiated by reacting with thiols, alcohols and amines. Thus, leading to the formation of thiomidates, imidates and amidines respectively. The nitrile group of OLT1177 is still not denoted as a covalent, noncovalent, irreversible or non-reversible inhibitor as there are currently no studies about its reactivity. Nevertheless, some researchers believe that dapansutrile promotes inhibition of NLRP3 through covalent bonds (Figure 4).

Summary Biological Effects of Dapansutrile

Pharmacokinetics

Selectivity 
Dapansutrile targets the inhibition of the NLRP3 ATPase and thus blocks the activation of the inflammasome's ASC, and caspase-1 interaction; thereby preventing the assembly of the inflammasome and inflammatory signals such as IL-1β and IL-18. This drug also inhibits pyroptosis. Nevertheless, the drug does not impact the mRNA levels of the NLRP3, ASC, caspase-1, IL-1β, and IL-18 genes.

Research of dapansutrile presents that the compound solely inhibits the NLRP3 inflammasome. Murine macrophages were used and stimulated with lipopolysaccharides and either flagellin or the dsDNA analog Poly(dA:dT) to activate inflammasomes such as NLRC4 and AIM 2 respectively. When Dapansutrile was added they found no difference in the release of TNF-α and IL-1β cytokines to when these inflammasomes were activated.

Other Drug Targets 
Other known targets of dapansutrile include several phosphorylated kinases such as Src; Fyn; HcK; STAT3. Human monocyte derived macrophages (HMDM) cells were stimulated with lipopolysaccharide, and nigericin. Dapansutrile was then added and they found a 26%, 35%, 43% and 33% reduction of these phosphorylated kinases respectively.

Dosages 
In vitro: Human derived macrophages were cultured to study the effect of dapansutrile cytokine production. It was found that dapansutrile at a 1 µM dose inhibited secretion of IL-1β by 60%, and IL-18 levels by 70%. The drug was also found to selectively inhibit pyroptosis at 10 µM.

In vivo: A phase one clinical trial of 35 subjects was conducted to establish the safety of dapansutrile. The daily mean plasma concentration maximum (Cmax) for a single oral dose of dapansutrile was 2,700 ng/mL for the 100-mg dose, 9,800 ng/mL for the 300 mg dose and 32,00 ng/mL for the 1,000 mg dose (Figure 5). Dapansutrile was also studied if given repeatedly once per day for 8 days with a dose of either 100 mg, and 300 mg, or 1,000 mg. The subjects mean plasma concentration on day 8 were 4,800 ng/mL for the 100 mg dose, 15,800 ng/mL for the 300 mg dose and 41,400 ng/mL for the 1,000 mg dose.

Pharmacodynamics

Safety and Efficacy of Dapansutrile 
In the Marchetti et al. study, seven of the 35 subjects reported adverse events. Five of the cases were in the single dose study while two cases were in the multi-regimen group. However, the adverse effects were considered unrelated to dapansutrile. Subjects presented no changes in blood pressure (systolic and diastolic), urinalysis, heart rate, liver function enzymes or acute phase proteins in the cohort after an 8-day trial with up to daily 1,000 mg dosing of dapansutrile.

Potential Therapeutic Applications

Neurodegenerative diseases 
Multiple Sclerosis:

Multiple sclerosis (MS) is a neurodegenerative disease characterized by the immune system deteriorating myelin. Myelin damage leads to the disruption of neuronal signaling, and dysregulrated inflammatory levels. Dapansutrile was used in the Experimental Autoimmune Encephalomyelitis (EAE) mouse model to understand its possible underlying effects for MS. It was found that mice fed with the dapansutrile diet protected the mice from demyelination in the spinal cord as well as decreased their levels of interleukins IL-1β and IL-18. Currently, it is unclear whether the drug could inhibit microglial reactivity, but currently it has no known benefits to aid in the prevention of dementia and cognitive function.

Inflammation 
Gouty Arthritis:

Gouty arthritis is an inflammatory joint disorder, partly induced to the activation of the NLRP3 inflammasome and excess IL-1β activation which leads to gout attacks. This is due to excess uric acid in the blood which promotes the formation of uric acid crystals in the joints. Uric acid is a known danger signal and induce the cleavage signal of the caspase-1 NLRP3 inflammasome.

Animal Model Experiments: In 2018, two murine models were used to validate Dapansutrile as a drug beneficial for acute joint inflammation. They injected zymosan or monosodium urate crystals in order to induce gouty arthritis in mice. OLT1177 was then either injected intraperitoneally or through their diet. In essence, the drug reduced joint inflammation, as well as interleukin levels demonstrating its therapeutic benefit for this disease.

Clinical Trials: As for clinical trials, Olatec Therapeutics also conducted a phase 2.a trials where Dapansutrile was given to 29 subjects with gouty arthritis.

Cardiovascular Diseases 
Acute Myocardial Infarction/ Heart Attack:

One of the major downstream effects of having coronary artery disease is possibility of having an acute myocardial infarction or heart attack. In mouse models, Dapansutrile was found to decrease infarct size a dose-dependent manner.

Heart Failure:

Olatec Therapeutics conducted a phase 1 clinical trial for Dapansutrile as a potential therapeutic for systolic heart failure. They have carried out a Phase 1 double blinded study with a total of 30 subjects to assess the drug's safety and pharmacodynamics. The drug was given in capsule form and the subjects were divided into 3 cohorts. Each cohort had 8 subjects taking an oral capsule with 100 mg Dapansutrile while 2 subjects were given the placebo capsule. Although the completion date of this clinical trial was on November 21, 2019 the results of the study have not yet been published.

Severe acute respiratory syndrome coronavirus 2 (SARS-CoV-2) / COVID-19:

Dapansutrile has been proposed by a number of scientists as a measure to reduce cardiovascular outcomes that seem to be brought on by COVID-19. The rationale behind using Dapansutrile is to inhibit the NLRP3 inflammasome and reduce the chances of a cytokine storm which seems to cause multi-organ failure in COVID-19 patients. Subjects with COVID-19 have shown to have an increased concentration of pro-inflammatory cytokines resulting in the cytokine storm, and thus producing an exhaustion of lymphocytes. NLRP3 not only activates cytokines but other key players that can inflict myocardial damages, and Acute Respiratory Distress Syndrome (ARDS), and its inhibition has been found to deter these outcomes. Thus, dapansutrile is proposed as a possible mediator to relief and prevent COVID-19 symptoms and effects.

References

Sulfonyl groups
Nitriles
Anti-inflammatory agents